This is a list of Olympic broadcasters of the 2012 Summer Olympics. The games in London, together with the 2012 Summer Paralympics were broadcast around the world, with Olympic Broadcasting Services (OBS), an agency of the International Olympic Committee, serving as the host broadcaster.

The home nation broadcaster was the BBC, which broadcast up to 5,000 hours of the competition and other material using over 27 channels including the red button, SKY, Freeview, Freesat and online. BBC paid £60 million for the rights of the broadcasting.

Broadcasters
NBCUniversal retained the rights in the United States, where they paid 32% higher than the 2008 edition broadcasting fee to International Olympic Committee (IOC), which is US$1.181 billion compared to 2008's US$894 million. USA Today also indicated that the broadcasting fee increased almost 100% over the past four decades. In Australia, Nine Network and Foxtel held the rights to broadcast the event, ending Seven Network's streak of five straight Olympic broadcasts since Barcelona 1992.

Two major cable television networks, ESPN and Eurosport, broadcast the Games in Asia, South America and Europe. Eurosport broadcast the Games throughout the continent of Europe for 746 millions dollar (with Vancouver 2010), while ESPN fed nine countries in South America and 22 countries in Asia. In some cases, one television station indirectly acquired the rights from IOC, namely CVM TV of Jamaica, which bought the rights from the International Media Content Limited (IMC) which has rights throughout the Caribbean.

The Games also saw two neighbouring regions sharing one television broadcaster apart from pay-TV. China Central Television (CCTV), which is known in Mainland China also provided a feed in Macau. For the first time, South Korea and North Korea shared one television provider, despite the two countries continuing to have diplomatic tensions.

The Games were broadcast in 3D around the world. IOC announced on 6 June 2012 that they would provide the livestream of the Games via YouTube for 64 territories across Asia and Africa.

 – Consortium formed by Bell Media, V, Rogers Media and Asian Television Network, with the broadcasts occurring on several properties of these companies (i.e.: CTV is owned by Bell Media and it were broadcast the games on FTA English-language television.).
 – It is a joint venture of NHK, Fuji Television, TBS TV, TV Asahi, TV Tokyo, NTV, and JAITS. Its functions are the same as the Canada's Olympic Broadcast Media Consortium.
 – Coverage on all smartphones across Japan, in cooperation with the Japan Consortium.
 – Coverage across Bolivia, Costa Rica, Dominican Republic, Ecuador, El Salvador, Guatemala, Honduras, Nicaragua, Paraguay and Uruguay.
 – Internet and mobile phone coverage across the Latin America.
 – Coverage across Argentina, Bolivia, Chile, Colombia, Ecuador, Paraguay, Peru, Uruguay and Venezuela.
 – It is a joint venture of Channel 3, TV5, Channel 7, Modernine TV and NBT.

See also

 Olympics on television
 List of 2008 Summer Olympics broadcasters

References

2012 Summer Olympics broadcasters
2012 Summer Olympics broadcasters
2012 Summer Olympics broadcasters
2012 Summer Olympics broadcasters
Broadcasters